Alhaji Abdulmalik Asekomhe Afegbua (1845-June 8, 1954) (OBE) was a Nigerian King and the first Paramount Otaru of Okpella kingdom.

References 

Nigerian traditional rulers
1845 births
1954 deaths